Charles E. Luke (16 March 1909 – 16 October 1983) was a professional footballer who played in the Football League for Darlington, Huddersfield Town, Sheffield Wednesday, Blackburn Rovers and Chesterfield. He was also on the books of Portsmouth, without representing them in the League, and played non-league football for Ushaw Moor, Tow Law Town, Esh Winning, Bishop Auckland, and Whitstable Town.

References

1909 births
1983 deaths
Footballers from County Durham
English footballers
Association football forwards
Ushaw Moor F.C. players
Tow Law Town F.C. players
Portsmouth F.C. players
Darlington F.C. players
Esh Winning F.C. players
Bishop Auckland F.C. players
Huddersfield Town A.F.C. players
Sheffield Wednesday F.C. players
Blackburn Rovers F.C. players
Chesterfield F.C. players
Whitstable Town F.C. players
English Football League players
People from Esh Winning